Postovaya is an former airbase of the Russian Air Force located near Oktyabrsky, Khabarovsk Krai, Russia.

The base was home to the 41st Fighter Aviation Regiment between 1943 and 1983 along with the 308th Fighter Aviation Regiment between 1983 and 1994.

References

Russian Air Force bases